Jin Xing (born August 13, 1967) is a Chinese ballerina, modern dancer, choreographer, actress, founder and artistic director of the contemporary dance company Shanghai. She is a transgender celebrity.

Early life 

Jin was born in 1967 in Shenyang, China, to an ethnic Korean family (Chosŏnjok). Jin studied in a local Chosonjok-Chinese elementary school. Her mother was a translator, and her father was a military intelligence officer.

She was noted for her intelligence, and had won abacus contests many times. She was very enthusiastic about dance performance. At age 9, she joined the People's Liberation Army to receive dance and military training from a troupe affiliated with the Shenyang Military Region. At age 12, she transferred to the People's Liberation Army Art Academy, graduating in 1984. After graduation, she returned to the Shenyang military dance troupe, eventually attained the rank of colonel. She later won the national dance contest with a Central Asian ethnic dance piece.

She won a scholarship to dance in New York. In 1989, Jin went to New York to study modern dance for four years, studying under modern dance pioneers such as Limon, Cunningham, and Graham.

Career

Dance 
Following her studies, Jin traveled and performed in Europe, and taught dance in Rome and Belgium, followed by a world tour, and returned to China in 1993.  She underwent sex reassignment surgery in 1995. Her left leg was paralyzed for three months after the surgery. In 1999, she opened her dance troupe, Jin Xing Dance Theatre.

Jin's dancing works are described by the Encyclopedia of Contemporary Chinese Culture as "startlingly original and provocative." These include The Imperial Concubine Has Been Drunk for Ages (Guifei zui jiu, an adaptation of the famous Peking opera title) and Cross Border–Crossing the Line (Cong dong dao xi, a collaboration with British pianist Joanna MacGregor).

Film and television 
Her film debut was in the Korean movie Resurrection of the Little Match Girl in 2002. In 2005, she appeared in the Thai movie Tom-Yum-Goong as the villain Madame Rose.

In 2013, she began her television career as a judge on China's first season of So You Think You Can Dance. Jin went viral when she scathingly commented on the show's host's attempt to turn a contestant's injury into a sob story. She stated, "Chinese TV always digs at people's scars, consumes their pain. This is the biggest weakness of Chinese TV and I hate it! I hope that on 'So You Think You Can Dance' we won't use people's pain, we won't use people's sympathy, we won't use people's suffering." Audiences appreciated her raw honesty, and nine months later she had her own nationally broadcast show.

Jin hosted her own television chat show The Jin Xing Show on Dragon TV between 2015 and 2017. In 2016, she began hosting the dating show Chinese Dating with the Parents, where parents decide on a prospective wife for their sons. The show received criticism for portraying a conservative view on marriage and the role of women in the family. According to Vivian Wang and Joy Dong of The New York Times, Jin "bristles at being called a conservative. If she were a male chauvinist, she said, she would have continued living as a man." She has also advocated against gender discrimination in employment.

Jin and her husband were contestants on The Amazing Race China 3 in 2016, where they finished 6th.

Other work 
She participated in the Stock Exchange of Visions project in 2007.

In May 2021, she appeared in an advertising campaign for Dior to promote the empowerment and independence of women.

In March 2022, Jin shared a post on Sina Weibo where she criticised President of Russia Vladimir Putin for launching military invasion into Ukraine. The post was taken down by Chinese censors.

Personal life
When Jin was six years old, she went outside during a storm, hoping that "lightning would strike and transform her into a girl". She underwent sex reassignment surgery in 1995 in Beijing.

Jin has adopted 3 children. At the age of 33, Jin adopted a son and then two other children she raised by herself until her marriage in 2005. She married her German husband Heinz Gerd Oidtmann in 2005. She currently lives with her husband and children in Shanghai.

In addition to her native Chinese, she can speak English, Korean, Japanese, Italian, and French.

Recognition
She was recognized as one of the BBC's 100 women of 2017.

Filmography
 Resurrection of the Little Match Girl (2002)
 Tom-Yum-Goong (2005)
 Birth of the Dragon (2016)

References

External links
 
Jin Xing: China's transgender TV star. An interview by BBC News.

1967 births
Living people
Chinese ballerinas
Chinese dancers
Transgender military personnel
People's Republic of China LGBT people
Chinese transgender people
Modern dancers
Actresses from Shenyang
Chinese people of Korean descent
Transgender actresses
Transgender dancers
Transgender women
Actresses from Liaoning
Chinese film actresses
Chinese television talk show hosts
BBC 100 Women
The Amazing Race contestants
Chinese LGBT actors